Diogo Pinheiro Sousa, known as Diogo, (born 20 March 1990) is a Brazilian professional footballer who plays for Spanish club Marino de Luanco, as a midfielder.

Career
Diogo has played in the Netherlands, Malta and Spain for Fortuna Sittard, Floriana, Mosta and Marino de Luanco.

References

1990 births
Living people
Brazilian footballers
Fortuna Sittard players
Floriana F.C. players
Mosta F.C. players
Marino de Luanco footballers
Eerste Divisie players
Maltese Premier League players
Brazilian expatriate footballers
Brazilian expatriate sportspeople in the Netherlands
Expatriate footballers in the Netherlands
Brazilian expatriate sportspeople in Malta
Expatriate footballers in Malta
Brazilian expatriate sportspeople in Spain
Expatriate footballers in Spain
Association football midfielders